= Wolf D. Gruner =

German historian, born 1944, University of Rostock

Wolf D. Gruner (born 1944) is a retired German historian who held the Chair of European History, Modern and Contemporary History at the University of Rostock from 1996 to his retirement.

== Works ==
- "Was There a Reformed Balance of Power System or Cooperative Great Power Hegemony?". The American Historical Review. 97 (3): 725–732. June 1992. doi:10.2307/2164777. ISSN 0002-8762. JSTOR 2164777.
